Phoebidas was a Spartan general who, in 382 BC, seized the Theban acropolis, thus giving Sparta control over Thebes.  To punish his unauthorized action, Phoebidas was relieved of command. Nevertheless, the Spartans continued to hold Thebes.  The Spartan king Agesilaus argued against punishing Phoebidas, on the grounds that his actions had benefitted Sparta, arguing that that was the only standard by which he should be judged.

In 378 BC, Phoebidas was killed by Theban cavalry under the command of the Theban general Gorgidas, while serving as the harmost of Thespiae.

Several years later, Phoebidas's actions appear to have been the model for a similar action by another general, Sphodrias, who attempted to seize Piraeus, the port of Athens.

References

Further reading

378 BC deaths
4th-century BC Spartans
Ancient Spartan generals
Year of birth unknown
Harmosts